Marjan Kamali (born 1971) is an Iranian-American novelist and author. She is a 2022 NEA Literature Fellow.

Biography
Kamali was born in Turkey to Iranian parents. She soon moved to Iran where she lived for a few years, followed by Hamburg, Germany where she started school. She subsequently lived in Kenya and Iran again before settling in the U.S. in 1982.

Kamali received a bachelor's degree in English literature from the University of California, Berkeley, an MBA from Columbia University, and an MFA from New York University.

Her first novel, Together Tea, was published in 2013 and was a Massachusetts Book Award finalist.

Books
 Together Tea. New York: Ecco Press/HarperCollins, 2013.
 The Stationery Shop. New York: Gallery Books/Simon & Schuster, 2019.

External links
 Author's website

References 

Living people
21st-century American women writers
21st-century Iranian women writers
1971 births